Rue Beautreillis is a street in The Marais, a historic area of the 4th arrondissement in central Paris, France.

Location and access
Rue Beautreillis, almost parallel to the Rue Saint-Paul and Rue du Petit-Musc, begins at Rue des Lions-Saint-Paul and ends at Rue Saint-Antoine. It successively crosses the Rue Charles-V and Rue Neuve-Saint-Pierre. Like many streets in old Paris, its narrow width is uneven and its buildings include traces of its long history of houses, hotels, and buildings dating from different eras.

Origin of the name
The street's name, attributed in 1555, is in memory of the Hotel de Beautreillis, which was built on the site of the Hôtel Saint-Pol, and which takes its name from the vines against the walls of the garden.

History
The street is cited under the names of "rue Girard-Bocquet" and “Rue de Beau-trillis” in a manuscript of 1636 where the records indicate that it is "found orderly, room and full of mud and filth".

By ministerial decision of 6 September 1836, the length of this road was increased from 188m to 231m by absorption of Rue Gérard-Beauquet (taken from the name of the owner of the Hotel de Beautreillis), formerly Rue du Pistolet.

It was at a barricade parallel to Rue Beautreillis on Rue Saint-Antoine that General François de Négrier was killed during June 1848.

Notable buildings and events

 Eugène Grangé (1810–1887) was born in the street on 16 December 1810 at the theatre here.
 No 6: remains of the Hotel Raoul.
 No 7: house with wrought iron terrace (historic monument).
 No 16: Victorien Sardou (1831–1908), dramatist,  was born here on 5 September 1831.
 No 17: Jim Morrison (1943–1971), lead singer of The Doors, died here in an apartment in the building, on 3 July 1971.
 No 22: Charles Baudelaire (1821–1867), poet, lived here with Jeanne Duval (c.1820–c.1862), actress and dancer.

Notes and references

External links

 Rue Beautreillis blog by Gaspard Landau

Streets in the 4th arrondissement of Paris
Le Marais
Jim Morrison